Todd Sand (born October 30, 1963) is an American pair skater. With his wife Jenni Meno, he is the 1998 World silver medalist, a two-time World bronze medalist (1995, 1996), and a three-time U.S. national champion (1994–96). With his previous partner Natasha Kuchiki, he is the 1991 World bronze medalist.

Personal life 
Sand was born in Burbank, California. He has dual American and Danish citizenship, since his father is Danish. He is married to Jenni Meno, with whom he has two sons, Jack, born in 2004, and Matthew Kenneth, born on August 14, 2006.

Early career 
Early in his career, Sand represented Denmark as a single skater. He competed for that country at the World and European Championships in the early 1980s.

In 1985, Sand began competing as a pair skater with Lori Blasko, representing the United States. They were the 1985 U.S. national bronze medalists on the junior level.

Career with Kuchiki 
Sand teamed up with Natasha Kuchiki in spring 1989. They won three senior pairs medals at the U.S. Championships, including gold in 1991, and competed at three World Championships, winning a surprising bronze in 1991. They also competed at the 1992 Winter Olympics, where they placed 6th. Kuchiki and Sand announced the end of their partnership in April 1992.

Career with Meno 

Meno and Sand teamed up on the ice in April 1992.  They had immediate success, qualifying for the 1993 World Figure Skating Championships in their first season with a 2nd-place finish at the U.S Nationals, and were the top Americans there placing 5th, qualifying 3 teams for the 1994 Winter Olympics in Lillehammer, Norway. They became U.S Champions in 1994, then placed 5th in arguably the strongest pairs field assembled in history in Lillehammer with 2 clean skates.

In 1995 they won their 2nd consecutive U.S title with perhaps their finest performance ever, gaining 6 perfect 6.0s for artistic impression.  They then came from 5th after the short program to win the bronze medal at the 1995 World Figure Skating Championships.  In 1996 they won their 3rd consecutive U.S title, and again climbed from 5th to 3rd, and won their second consecutive World bronze medal.

In 1997, they set themselves up as possible contenders for the World title early in the season, beating both the World gold and World silver medalist Marina Eltsova and Andrei Bushkov, and Mandy Woetzel and Ingo Steuer in fall competitions.   They had also gained the necessary side by side triple toes that had prevented them from a higher finish than 3rd place at the previous 2 World Championships.  They however lost their form and suffered a last place finish at the Champions Series final in Hamilton, Ontario, and lost their U.S title to Kyoko Ina and Jason Dungjen.   With a chance for the World title after major mistakes by the other top teams they suffered another lackluster outing and dropped to 5th at the 1997 World Figure Skating Championships.

After a dismal performance in Nagano in finishing 8th, they ended their career on a high on home ice in Minneapolis at the 1998 World Figure Skating Championships, winning the short program, and taking the silver medal, their highest finish ever at Worlds. Following their retirement from competitive skating, they skated professionally in the Stars on Ice tour for six seasons.

Post Skating Career 

Sand appeared in the ITV series Dancing on Ice with double Olympic gold medallist Kelly Holmes. They were eliminated in quarterfinal (Week 6) after the judges' votes to save Bonnie Langford and her partner Matt Evers.

Sand works as a coach with his wife. They previously coached John Baldwin / Rena Inoue, Mary Beth Marley / Rockne Brubaker, and Jessica Calalang / Zack Sidhu. Currently, they coach Alexa Scimeca Knierim / Brandon Frazier.

Sand is an ISU Technical Specialist. He was a technical specialist for the men's event at the 2005 World Championships.

Competitive highlights

Pairs career for the United States

With Jenni Meno

With Natasha Kuchiki

With Lori Blasko

Singles career for Denmark

References

External links

 Official site
 Skatabase: 1980s Worlds Men's Results
 Skatabase: 1980s Europeans Men's Results
 The Figure Skating Corner profile
 Pairs on Ice: Blasko & Sand
 Pairs on Ice: Kuchiki & Sand
 Pairs on Ice: Meno & Sand
 Meno, Sand to coach Inoue, Baldwin

1963 births
American male pair skaters
Danish male single skaters
Figure skaters at the 1992 Winter Olympics
Figure skaters at the 1994 Winter Olympics
Figure skaters at the 1998 Winter Olympics
Figure skating reality television participants
International Skating Union technical specialists
Living people
Olympic figure skaters of the United States
World Figure Skating Championships medalists
Competitors at the 1990 Goodwill Games